The 2020 Rhythmic Gymnastics European Championships is the 36th edition of the Rhythmic Gymnastics European Championships, which took place on 26–29 November 2020 at the Palace of Sports in Kyiv, Ukraine. Because of the COVID-19 pandemic, many competitors withdrew from the competition, such as Russia, Italy, and the Belarusian and Bulgarian groups.

Participating countries

Updated on November 22nd 2020.

Competition schedule
Thursday November 26
11:00-13:30 CI juniors individual rope and ball Set A + B
13:45-15:25 CI juniors individual rope and ball Set C
16:30-17:15 CI senior groups 5 balls
17:30–18:30 Opening Ceremony
Friday November 27
12:00–13:40 CI juniors individual clubs and ribbon Set C
13:55–16:25 CI juniors individual clubs and ribbon Set A + B
17:30–18:15 CI senior groups 3 hoops 4 clubs
18:15–18:30 Award Ceremony – Team Competition
18:30–18:45 Award Ceremony – Senior groups all around 
Saturday November 28
13:00-14:10 CII Apparatus finals juniors rope and ball
14:15-15:25 CII Apparatus finals juniors clubs and ribbon
15:25-15:45 Award Ceremony – Juniors finals
16:00-16:45 CII senior groups finals 5 balls
17:00-17:45 CII senior groups finals 3 hoops and 4 clubs
17:45-18:00 CII Award Ceremony – Senior group finals
Sunday November 29
11:45-13:15 CIII senior individuals set C + D (4 apparatus)
14:00-15:30 CIII senior individuals set B + A (2 apparatus)
15:45-17:15 CIII senior individuals Set B + A (2 apparatus)
17:20-17:30 Award Ceremony – Senior individuals
17:30-18:00 Closing Ceremony
Source:

Medal winners

Results

Team

Junior Individual

Rope

Ball

Clubs

Ribbon

Senior Individual

All-around

Senior Groups

Group all-around

5 Balls

3 Hoops + 4 Clubs

Medal count

External links
Official site

References

Rhythmic Gymnastics European Championships
European Rhythmic Gymnastics Championships
International sports competitions hosted by Ukraine
Rhythmic Gymnastics European Championships
Sports competitions in Kyiv
Rhythmic
2020s in Kyiv